Ernest Thompson (born 1892) was an English professional footballer who played as a winger.

References

1892 births
People from Rotherham
English footballers
Association football wingers
South Shields F.C. (1889) players
Rotherham County F.C. players
Portsmouth F.C. players
Sheffield Wednesday F.C. players
Bradford (Park Avenue) A.F.C. players
Grimsby Town F.C. players
Castleford Town F.C. players
Denaby United F.C. players
Scunthorpe United F.C. players
English Football League players
Year of death missing